Mike or Michael Bartlett may refer to:

Mike Bartlett (playwright) (born 1980), English playwright and theatre director
Mike Bartlett (ice hockey) (born 1985), American ice hockey player
Michael Bartlett (rugby union) (born 1978), New Zealand rugby union player
Michael Bartlett (director), American filmmaker, producer, screenwriter, and editor